Demons Fall for an Angel's Kiss is the 1994 studio solo album of the American deathrock veteran musician Eva O.

Recording history
For this solo project, Eva O wanted to write a dark concept album about angels and began searching for literature about the subject, and the album was initially entitled Angels Fall for a Demon's Kiss. After reading through books that approached the subject from a new age point of view, Eva decided to look for more traditional sources and read Billy Graham's book titled Angels. After reading the book, Eva realized the hierarchy of angels and rewrote the album, titling it Demons Fall for an Angel's Kiss.

Musically, the album emphasizes on a mellower and calmer yet dark, atmospheric deathrock. Eva O's haunting vocals are upfront in the mix and dominate the output, with the echoed guitars and keyboards being less apparent.

Track listing
"Daydreamer" - 5:48
"Children of the Light" - 4:20
"Angel on Earth" - 4:42
"Angel of Fire" - 2:18
"For the Angels 1" - 1:20
"Take a Jesus" - 3:11
"Angel of Death - 4:41
"Universal Trip" - 4:54
"For The Angel 2"- 0:11
"Souls That Save" - 5:26
"Power of Hope" - 3:54
"Unveil" - 3:55

References

1994 albums
Eva O albums